Svetlana Kryuchkova may refer to:

 Svetlana Kryuchkova, Soviet and Russian actress
 Svetlana Valentinovna Kryuchkova, Russian volleyball player